Yine may refer to:
 Yine people, an ethnic group of the Amazon
 Yine language, an Arawakan language

See also 
 
 Iine (disambiguation)